This is a list of singles that charted in the top ten of the Billboard Argentina Hot 100 chart in 2019.

Top-ten singles
Key
 – indicates single's top 10 entry was also its Hot 100 debut
(#) – 2019 year-end top 10 single position and rank

2018 peaks

2020 peaks

See also
List of Billboard Argentina Hot 100 number-one singles of 2019

Notes 

Notes for re-entries

References

Argentina Hot 100 Top Ten Singles
Argentine record charts
Argentina 2019